The Mixed doubles squash competitions at the 2022 Commonwealth Games in Birmingham, England will take place between August 3rd and 7th at the University of Birmingham Hockey and Squash Centre. A total of 56 competitors from 16 nations took part.

Schedule
The schedule is as follows:

Results
The draw is as follows:

Finals

Top half

Bottom half

References

External link
Results
 

Squash at the 2022 Commonwealth Games